Folkestone and Hythe is a local government district in Kent, England, in the south-east of the county. Its council is based in the town of Folkestone. The authority was renamed from Shepway in April 2018, and therefore has the same name as the Folkestone and Hythe parliamentary constituency, although a somewhat narrower area is covered by the district.

Most of the population live in the coastal towns of Folkestone and Hythe. The north of the district mainly consists of landscape villages interspersed with woods along parts of the North Downs, while the south features a coastal expanse of lower lying, periodically reclaimed villages in less forested Romney Marsh, which has a number of communities extensively built in the medieval period and 17th century as centres of the Romney Marsh wool trade. The district's economy is influenced by the Channel Tunnel Rail Link and the M20 motorway, while the tourism and allied retail sectors provide key sources of employment.

History

The modern district covers roughly the same area as the Lathe of Shepway, which contained the hundreds and liberties of Aloesbridge, Bircholt, Folkestone, Ham, Heane, Longport, Loningborough, Lydd, Newchurch, New Romney, Stouting/Stowting, Street and Worth. Its 1861 population was 51,826. The lathe originated as the territory of the Limenwara, one of the regiones of Jutish Kent, but had become obsolete by the end of the 19th century, before reappearing in its present guise in 1974. Windmills served to assist pumping of water as well as grinding of corn, barley, rye and wheat in the district.

The Royal Court of Shepway, which met near Lympne at a place called Shepway Cross, was the principal court of the Cinque Ports Federation. Folkestone & Hythe District Council uses the Folkestone White Horse as a logo.

Governance

The district was formed as Shepway on 1 April 1974 by the merger of Folkestone, Hythe, Lydd and New Romney [Municipal] Boroughs along with Elham and Romney Marsh Rural Districts.

First tier
This consists of town councils in Folkestone, Hythe, New Romney, Lydd and Hawkinge; and the following parish councils:
Acrise (M)
Brenzett
Brookland
Burmarsh
Dymchurch
Elham
Elmsted
Ivychurch
Lyminge
Lympne
Monks Horton (M)
Newchurch
Newington
Old Romney (M)
Paddlesworth (M)
Postling
St Mary in the Marsh
Saltwood
Sandgate
Sellindge
Snargate (M)
Stelling Minnis
Stowting (M)
Stanford
Swingfield
(M) Parishes marked thus are served by a parish meeting, not a parish council

Wards
The District Council consists of 30 councillors representing 13 wards.: 
Folkestone: six wards (Broadmead; Cheriton; East Folkestone; Folkestone Central; Folkestone Harbour; Sandgate and West Folkestone)
Hythe
Hythe Rural
New Romney
North Downs East (including Elham and Hawkinge)
North Downs West (including Stelling Minnis, Lyminge and Sellindge)
Romney Marsh
Walland and Denge Marsh

Council Composition 

Following the May 2015 elections, the composition of Folkestone & Hythe District Council was 22 Conservatives, 7 UKIP and 1 Labour.
In October 2016 the 1 Labour councillor defected to the Conservative party; this saw the composition of Folkestone & Hythe District Council as: 23 Conservatives and 7 UKIP.

Following the 2019 Local Elections, the Conservatives lost their majority on the council but remained the largest party. The Conservative Party won 13 seats, The Green Party and Labour both won 6, UKIP and the Liberal Democrats won 2 and an Independent won 1 seat. Since then one Labour councillor has left the party to sit as an independent.

The current cabinet comprises a 4-way coalition with Conservatives councillors as well as two independent councillors as well as a Green and a Liberal Democrat councillor.

Controversies

Undeclared gifts from Lydd Airport 
In 2011, Lydd Airport's owners, seeking to expand the airport, gave gifts to councillors that the councillors did not declare.

Otterpool Park planning permission 
Folkestone and Hythe District Council was reported to have spent over £50m up to July 2020 on a proposed housing development on the former Folkestone Racecourse site, despite the 10,000 home scheme not having planning permission.  The site had been bought for £4m in 2016 by the billionaire Reuben brothers via a British Virgin Islands-registered company 'Cozumel Estates' who then submitted development proposals to the council for approval, in a partnership with the council.  The brothers withdrew from the scheme in 2019 and sold the site to the council for £25m in 2020.

Geography
Folkestone and Hythe occupies the most southerly part of Kent. It is bounded on the north by Ashford and Canterbury Districts; on the east by Dover District and on the south by the Strait of Dover. The Romney and Walland Marshes cover a good deal of its area to the west; where the North Downs begin to reach the sea there is much more in the way of settlement. Four out of five towns in the District are located along the coast. The district area is the same size as the similarly named Folkestone & Hythe parliamentary constituency, but leaves out the Saxon Shore ward from the neighbouring Borough of Ashford.

Climate
Climate in this area has mild differences between highs and lows, and there is adequate rainfall year-round.  The Köppen Climate Classification subtype for this climate is "Cfb" (Marine West Coast Climate/Oceanic climate).

History 

Folkestone & Hythe was an ancient division of Kent and originated, probably in the 6th century, during the Jutish colonisation. It was originally named Lympne, but by the thirteenth century its name was changed to Shepway. It was one of the seven original lathes of Kent and remained after that number was reduced to five. Like the other lathes it contained several hundreds.

The lathe was an important administrative, judicial and taxation unit for 600 years after the Domesday Book.  The sheriff toured the county twice yearly attending on the lathes, however the lathe court became anomalous as it fell between the hundredal courts below and the justices of the county (in petty and quarter sessions) above.  When the lathe and division of the lathe were used as the basis for meetings of local justices of the peace in monthly or petty sessions, Shepway became the unit for this purpose, however a group of hundreds in the middle of the Lathe of Scray, centred on Ashford,  were for convenience attached to the Lathe of Shepway for petty sessional purposes. These were the four Hundreds of Felborough, Wye, Calehill, and Chart and Longbridge, with the township of Ashford.

The corporation of Romney Marsh, although within Shepway, possessed its own quarter and petty sessions (separate from the county).

Although not formally abolished, Shepway fell out of usage at the end of the 19th century, only to reappear on 1 April 1974 as a merger of the boroughs of Folkestone, Hythe, Lydd and New Romney, along with Elham and Romney Marsh Rural Districts. Some parishes along the northern boundary of Shepway were left out when it was revived as a local government unit in 1974, principally those that were in the Hundreds of Ham and Bircholt (Barony). Also omitted were some parishes in Folkestone Hundred, just east of the town. Nevertheless, Shepway was the last of the five lathes of Kent that recognisably continued as a principal local government unit of the county.

On 17 January 2018 a proposal to rename the local authority was passed by councillors, with the new name of Folkestone and Hythe District Council being implemented with effect on 1 April 2018. The council claimed that after 44 years there was still some confusion as to where Shepway was.

Housing and architecture

The layout of the main towns is one of Victorian streets interspersed with apartment blocks, including a few tower blocks with otherwise housing in the district formed of low-rise apartments, semi-detached, terraced or (less often) detached homes with typically smallholdings or small gardens.

The number of listed buildings in the district exceeds 200.  This includes 18 churches listed in the highest grading in the national listing system (Grade I).  Three castles or their bailey towers survive from the medieval period.

An examples at Grade I is Davison's Mill, a large windmill set by a green rolling lawn.

Economy
In economic terms, Folkestone and Hythe is the third most deprived area in Kent, after Thanet and Swale. Like them, it has a high rate of unemployment; poor educational attainment figures; and with the majority of businesses being small operations. The major source of economy is, however, tourism. Events and venues are widely publicised.

Transport
The M20  crosses the north of the District to end at Folkestone, carrying traffic from London, M25 and Maidstone to the district.

Also following the M20 is the A20 which goes by nearby villages in the district. The A20 also continues onto Dover.

The A259 south coast road starts at Folkestone via Hythe, Kent and Romney Marsh in the district to Rye, East Sussex, Hastings, Bexhill-on-Sea, Eastbourne, Brighton, Worthing, Littlehampton, Bognor Regis and Chichester to Emsworth near Portsmouth.

The A260 leaves Folkestone to the A2 for Canterbury.

The A2070 links the Romney Marsh to Ashford and the M20.

Stagecoach South East operate all local buses in the district to Dover, Canterbury, Hastings, Maidstone and Ashford. Stagecoach also run coach route 021 to London from the district on behalf of National Express.

The South Eastern Main Line and High Speed 1 both cross the district. Domestic trains are provided by Southeastern and serve the stations of Westenhanger, Sandling, Folkestone West and Folkestone Central in the district. Trains go to London Charing Cross via Ashford International and Tonbridge to the west and Ramsgate via Dover Priory to the east.

The western end of the Channel Tunnel is at Cheriton, just west of Folkestone and trains that carry cars are provided by Eurotunnel. The tunnel is accessed by the M20 and the A20. Eurostar also use the tunnel but its nearest station to the district is next door in Ashford at Ashford International.

There are no longer cross channel ferry services in the district and these are now concentrated at the Port of Dover..

The Royal Military Canal starts at Seabrook, near the sea at Sandgate, and runs through Hythe town centre and the northern edge of the Romney Marsh.

The Romney, Hythe & Dymchurch Railway is a light railway that operates over almost 14 miles from Hythe to Dungeness via Dymchurch, New Romney, and some smaller intermediate stations.

Several long distance footpaths cross the District, including the Saxon Shore Way and the North Downs Way; shorter walks include the "Elham Valley Walk" and the "Royal Military Canal Path".

Lydd Airport is also in this district which handles small passenger flights to Le Touquet in France and Cargo flights to Ostend, Belgium. The Airport is served by routes 11 and 101.

Notable people

References

 
Lathes of Kent
Non-metropolitan districts of Kent